Human rhinovirus internal cis-acting regulatory element (CRE) is
a CRE from the human rhinoviruses. The CRE is located within the genome segment encoding the capsid proteins so is found in a protein coding region. The element is essential for efficient viral replication and it has been suggested that the CRE is required for initiation of minus-strand RNA synthesis.

See also 
Human parechovirus 1 (HPeV1) cis regulatory element (CRE)
Rotavirus cis-acting replication element (CRE)

References

External links 
 

Cis-regulatory RNA elements
Enteroviruses